A number of steamships were named Bulgaria, including:

, a 10,237 GRT liner in service 1898–1917
, a 4,191 GRT cargo ship in service 1948–76

Ship names